"Llueve Por Dentro" is a ballad performed by Puerto Rican-American singer-songwriter Luis Fonsi. It was officially revealed to be the third single of his most successful album to date Palabras del Silencio (2008) via his official website on June 30, 2009. and will be sent to radios in the middle of July, since his previous single still receives significant airplay in Latin American radio stations.

Chart performance

References

2009 singles
2008 songs
Luis Fonsi songs
Spanish-language songs
Songs written by Claudia Brant
Universal Music Latino singles
Songs written by Luis Fonsi
2000s ballads
Pop ballads